Douglas is a suburb of Townsville in the City of Townsville, Queensland, Australia.

Geography 

Though mainly residential, it does contain James Cook University and the Townsville University Hospital. The suburb is also known due to the Douglas Arterial Road which is a dual-carriageway motorway through the suburb, and was the first stage of the Townsville Ring Road.

History 
The suburb was named by the Queensland Place Names Board on 1 July 1968 after Robert Johnstone Douglas, a judge of the Supreme Court of Queensland from 1923 to 1953.

The suburb is in the middle of a residential boom, with student accommodation expansion projects at James Cook University and also the establishment of two Housing estates in close proximity.

Enkindle Village School opened at the James Cook University campus on 19 February 2019 with 17 students from Prep to Year 3.

Education 
Endkindle Village School is a private primary (Prep-6) school for boys and girls at 1 James Cook Drive within James Cook University. It will be accepting all primary year students by 2022.

Tec-NQ is a private secondary (11-12) school for boys and girls at 54 Discovery Drive. In 2017, the school had an enrolment of 267 students with 21 teachers and 27 non-teaching staff (23 full-time equivalent).

There are no government schools in Douglas. The nearest government primary school is in neighbouring Annandale, while the nearest government secondary schools are Thuringowa State High School in Condon and Heatley Secondary College in Heatley.

Population
According to the 2016 census of Population, there were 7,744 people in Douglas.
 Aboriginal and Torres Strait Islander people made up 2.7% of the population. 
 71.4% of people were born in Australia. The next most common countries of birth were India 4.3%, England 2.3% and New Zealand 1.7%.   
 76.9% of people spoke only English at home. Other languages spoken at home included Malayalam at 3.2%. 
 The most common responses for religion were No Religion 38.3%, Catholic 19.2% and Anglican 10.4%.

References

External links 
 

Suburbs of Townsville